The 2015 German Indoor Athletics Championships was the 62nd edition of the national championship in indoor track and field for Germany. It was held on 21–22 February at the Dm-Arena in Karlsruhe. It was the eighth time that Karlsruhe hosted event and a total of 8600 spectators attended.  A total of 26 events, 12 for men and 13 for women, were contested plus four further events were held separately. It was to serve as preparation for the 2015 European Athletics Indoor Championships. The competition was originally scheduled to take place in the Europahalle, but the venue was changed for security reasons.

The combined events national championships were canceled in 2015. The racewalking competitions were held on 27 February in Erfurt, while the 3 × 800 m and 3 × 1000 m relays were held on 15 February alongside the  German Indoor Youth Athletics Championships in Neubrandenburg.

Results

Men

Women

References

Results
Overall Results. German Athletics Federation. Retrieved 2021-04-06.

German Indoor Athletics Championships
German Indoor Athletics Championships
German Indoor Athletics Championships
German Indoor Athletics Championships
Sport in Karlsruhe